Miroir (French "mirror") may refer to:

Miroir (film), 1947 with Jean Gabin
Miroir (album) by Marie-Mai 2012 
Miroirs, a suite by French composer Maurice Ravel

Geography
Le Miroir, Saône-et-Loire
Le Miroir, hamlet Sainte-Foy-Tarentaise